Ismagilovo (İsmäğil) is a rural locality (a village) in Tuzlukushevsky Selsoviet, Belebeyevsky District, Bashkortostan, Russia. The population was 105 as of 2010. There are 3 streets.

Geography 
Ismagilovo is located 12 km north of Belebey (the district's administrative centre) by road. Repyevka is the nearest rural locality.

References 

Rural localities in Belebeyevsky District